Connecticut elected its members April 2, 1821.

See also 
 1820 and 1821 United States House of Representatives elections
 List of United States representatives from Connecticut

1821
Connecticut
United States House of Representatives